Antoine L'Écuyer (born 1997) is a French Canadian actor known for his lead role of Léon Doré in It's Not Me, I Swear! (C'est pas moi, je le jure!) for which he won the Best Actor Award at the Atlantic Film Festival. He is also known for his role as Daniel Delage, a sick Montreal Canadiens fan in the film Pour toujours, les Canadiens!.

He is the grandson of actor Guy L'Écuyer.

Filmography
2007: Les Boys as Gabriel Toupin (TV, 1 episode)
2008: It's Not Me, I Swear! (C'est pas moi, je le jure!) as Léon Doré
2009: The Canadiens, Forever (Pour toujours, les Canadiens!) as Daniel Delage
2010: Les Rescapés
2013: The Four Soldiers (Les 4 soldats)
2014: La Garde
2015: Chorus
2015: The Sound of Trees (Le Bruit des arbres)
2015: Corbo
2015-2019: Jérémie
2017: The Little Girl Who Was Too Fond of Matches
2019: Living 100 MPH (Vivre à 100 milles à l'heure)

Dubbing
2009: Astro Boy (voice over for the film's French edition)

Awards
In 2009, won Best Actor for role in It's Not Me, I Swear! (C'est pas moi, je le jure!) at the Atlantic Film Festival (Halifax, Nova Scotia, Canada)

References

External links

Antoine L'Écuyer page on Cinoche site

1997 births
Living people
Canadian male child actors
Canadian male film actors
Male actors from Quebec
Canadian male television actors
Canadian male voice actors